Nijboer may refer to:

 Ben Nijboer (1915–1999), Dutch theoretical physicist
 Erwin Nijboer (born 1964), Dutch cyclist
 Friso Nijboer, Dutch chess player
 Gerard Nijboer, Dutch long-distance runner
 Henk Nijboer, Dutch politician
 Ryan Nijboer, Dutch tennis player

Dutch-language surnames